McGiven is a surname. Notable people with the surname include:

Kevin McGiven (born 1977), American football player and coach
Mick McGiven (born 1951), English footballer

See also
McGivern
McNiven